Benington may refer to:

 Benington, Hertfordshire, England, a village and parish
 Benington, Lincolnshire, England, a village and parish
 John Benington (1921–1969), American basketball coach
 Walter Benington (1872–1936), British photographer

See also 
 Bennington (disambiguation)